Ma Jun ( 220–265), courtesy name Deheng, was a Chinese mechanical engineer, inventor, and politician who lived in the state of Cao Wei during the Three Kingdoms period of China. His most notable invention was that of the south-pointing chariot, a directional compass vehicle which actually had no magnetic function, but was operated by use of differential gears (which applies equal amount of torque to driving wheels rotating at different speeds). It is because of this revolutionary device (and other achievements) that Ma Jun is known as one of the most brilliant mechanical engineers and inventors of his day (alongside Zhang Heng of the earlier Eastern Han dynasty). The device was re-invented by many after Ma Jun, including the astronomer and mathematician Zu Chongzhi (429–500). In the later medieval dynastic periods, Ma Jun's south-pointing chariot was combined in a single device with the distance-measuring odometer.

Life
According to his friend and contemporary poet and philosopher Fu Xuan (217–278), Ma Jun was born in Fufeng Commandery, which is located around present-day Xingping, Shaanxi. In his youth, Ma Jun travelled throughout present-day Henan and obtained the position of a boshi (博士; a minor literary degree). Despite this degree, Ma Jun was relatively poor in his youth, yet found means to gain recognition by employing his natural genius in creating mechanical contraptions and inventions.

Ma Jun was a somewhat distinguished official serving under the state of Cao Wei, becoming an Official Who Concurrently Serves in the Palace. Ma Jun once oversaw the construction of Chonghua Palace under the orders of Cao Rui, the second Wei emperor. Ma Jun was very well known in Wei as a very gifted designer of weapons and certain types of devices, and was praised especially by Fu Xuan in an essay of his. Fu Xuan noted that Ma Jun was not the best orator or master of rhetorics, and had trouble conveying his ideas to others with his somewhat introverted personality. Nonetheless, he gained fame for his mechanical genius, and is universally considered one of the greatest mechanical engineers of ancient China.

Engineering and technological achievements

One of Ma Jun's early inventions was an improved silk drawloom, which, according to Fu Xuan, earned Ma Jun considerable recognition for his innovative skill. In his time, silk looms generally had fifty heddles and fifty treadles, some even up to sixty of each. Ma Jun crafted a loom that had only twelve treadles, which not only made the process faster and more efficient, but also allowed the weaving of new intricate patterns.

While serving in the Wei government, Ma Jun got into a dispute with Gaotang Long and Qin Lang over the concept of the south-pointing carriage, or the south-pointing chariot. Gaotang Long and Qin Lang mocked Ma Jun for his belief in historical texts that the south-pointing chariot had actually been invented in the past (as the legend goes, by the Yellow Emperor), something they viewed as nonsensical, non-historical myth. Ma Jun retorted, "Empty arguments with words cannot (in any way) compare with a test which will show practical results". After being instructed to craft such a device, Ma Jun completed his fully functional design of the south-pointing chariot in the year 235. With this mechanical-driven compass-vehicle device, Ma Jun created one of the first mechanical devices in the world to employ differential gear designs. Referring to history of differential gears, Ma Jun's differential gear is the earliest historically verifiable design. In China, the south-pointing chariot was re-invented a second time by Zu Chongzhi (429–500) due to the original detailed instructions being lost.

Ma Jun once invented for the Wei emperor Cao Rui an intricate hydraulic-powered, mechanical-operated puppet theatre (much more complex than the mechanical puppet set discovered by Liu Bang (Emperor Gao), the founding emperor of the Han dynasty, when he observed the state-absorbed items taken from the treasury of Qin Shi Huang). His puppet theatre is similar to that of a Greek model invented by Heron of Alexandria, the difference being that the latter used instead a rotating cylindrical cogwheel with ropes and pulleys to operate his mechanical theatre. Joseph Needham describes Ma Jun's mechanical theatre in a passage taken from the Records of the Three Kingdoms: 

Possibly inspired by this incredible mechanical theatre of puppets, Qu Zhi of the Jin dynasty (266–420) made similar mechanical sets with wooden dolls. Joseph Needham states that he was famous for his "wooden dolls' house, with images which opened doors and bowed, and for his 'rats' market', which had figures which automatically closed the doors when the rats wanted to leave".

Ma Jun was also responsible for the construction of square-pallet chain pumps meant for irrigation. However, Ma Jun was not the first person in China to invent such a device. An earlier account was made in the year 80 by the philosopher Wang Chong in his Discourses Weighed in the Balance. The Eastern Han dynasty court eunuch Zhang Rang once ordered the engineer Bi Lan to construct a series of chain pumps outside the capital city of Luoyang, used for irrigation and means of fresh water source. Ma Jun constructed his square-pallet chain pumps to water newly designated garden space established within Luoyang by Cao Rui.

See also
 Lists of people of the Three Kingdoms
 List of mechanical engineers
 History of science and technology in China

References

 Chen, Shou (3rd century). Records of the Three Kingdoms (Sanguozhi).
 
 Fan, Ye (5th century). Book of the Later Han (Houhanshu).
 
 Pei, Songzhi (5th century). Annotations to Records of the Three Kingdoms (Sanguozhi zhu).

External links
 South-pointing chariot at DR Gears

Cao Wei politicians
Chinese inventors
Chinese mechanical engineers
Engineers from Shaanxi
Hydraulic engineers
Politicians from Xianyang
Scientists from Shaanxi